Michel Deziel (born January 31, 1954 in Sorel-Tracy, Quebec) is a Canadian former professional ice hockey left winger.  He was drafted in the third round, 47th overall, by the Buffalo Sabres in the 1974 NHL Amateur Draft. He played one game in the National Hockey League with the Sabres, appearing in a single playoff contest during 1975 playoffs, on May 1, 1975 against the Montreal Canadiens. He did not score a point. The rest of his career, which lasted from 1974 to 1980, was spent in the minor leagues.

Deziel was a star in Quebec Major Junior Hockey League, one season (1973–74) scoring 227 points in 69 games for the Sorel Black Hawks, a team that averaged 8.9 goals per game. The mark stands as the fourth-highest single-season point total in QMJHL history.

He was also drafted by the World Hockey Association's New England Whalers; however, he never played in that league.

Career statistics

Regular season and playoffs

See also
 List of players who played only one game in the NHL

External links

References

1954 births
Living people
Binghamton Dusters players
Buffalo Sabres draft picks
Buffalo Sabres players
Canadian ice hockey left wingers
Hershey Bears players
Ice hockey people from Quebec
Milwaukee Admirals (IHL) players
New England Whalers draft picks
Rhode Island Reds players
Sportspeople from Sorel-Tracy
Sorel Éperviers players